The ICW World Heavyweight Championship is a professional wrestling world heavyweight championship owned by Scotland's Insane Championship Wrestling promotion. The title was first established as the ICW National Heavyweight Championship at ICW's debut show on October 15, 2006, with Drew Galloway becoming the inaugural champion. On February 7, 2015, the title was officially renamed the ICW World Heavyweight Championship after Galloway successfully defended the title in a match against Matt Hardy for the Family Wrestling Entertainment promotion in New York. The championship has been defended in the United Kingdom, Ireland, the United States, Australia, Denmark, Italy and Germany. In addition to these international title matches, defenses can be seen televised in over 30 countries via Fight Network as well as an international presence on iPPV.

Overall, there have been twenty-six reigns shared among nineteen wrestlers, with three vacancies.  The championship was vacant for 74 days as ICW had to strip Noam Dar of the title on 7 September 2021 due to COVID-19 restrictions. 

The championship was featured prominently in both the Insane Fight Club documentaries produced by the BBC.

History
Drew Galloway became the inaugural champion of Mark Dallas' ICW promotion on 15 October 2006 at their debut show "Fear & Loathing," having won a triple threat match against Darkside and Allan Grogan.

Initially a regional heavyweight title in the Glasgow area, the title was defended outside Scotland for the first time by Jack Jester, who defeated Jimmy Havoc in London, England to retain the title on May 4, 2014. It was first defended overseas by Drew Galloway on December 20, 2014 in Denmark for Dansk Pro Wrestling promotion, when Galloway won a Title-for-Title Three-Way match against DPW Champion Michael Fynne and Chaos. Galloway then announced his intention to take the title overseas more often and make it a World Championship. His second international title defense was booked for February 7, 2015 against Matt Hardy in New York, USA after which the title was officially renamed the ICW World Heavyweight Championship. The ICW World Heavyweight Championship was defended in Australia for the first time on March 20, 2015 when Galloway retained in a Title-for-Title match over OCW Championship Andy Phoenix at an Outback Championship Wrestling show. The title was first defended in Northern Ireland when Galloway retained over Joe Hendry, TRON and Luther Valentine in a four-way match at a Pro Wrestling Ulster. Galloway again defended the title in America on July 18, 2015 at a Warriors of Wrestling show in Staten Island where he retained over Joey Ace, Matt Macintosh and Logan Black. Galloway defended the championship in Kiel, Germany at a Maximum Wrestling show on October 16, retaining in a Title-for-Title triple threat over UEWA European Champion Chaos and Apu Singh. Big Damo would go on to win the championship from Chris Renfrew in Northern Ireland, before defending the title successfully in Wales and Ireland on ICW's 2016 tour. The title was defended in Italy for the first by Wolfgang on December 17, 2016. Another notable international title defense saw Trent Seven retain the title over Wolfgang on April 2, 2017, at a WWE WrestleMania Axxess show.

In addition to these international title matches, numerous wrestlers from outside Scotland have challenged for the title domestically, including Kassius Ohno, Sabu, Fergal Devitt, Martin Stone, Doug Williams, Rhino, Colt Cabana, Tommy End, Noam Dar, Pete Dunne, Jordan Devlin, Dave Mastiff, Robbie Dynamite, Zack Gibson, Johnny Moss, Rampage Brown, Kris Travis and Bram. The only non-Scottish wrestlers to hold the championship are Mikey Whiplash, Trent Seven and Big Damo.

The title was defended in a pre-show "Dark" segment for the first time in its history on 17 October 2015 when Drew Galloway would retain the title twice in consecutive matches against Matt Daly and Stephen Hughes and Coach Trip.

Statistics 
As of November 2017, BT Gunn has the record for most reigns, with three. Darkside's first reign is the longest in the title's history, at 1028 days (the company was largely inactive during this period), while Joe Coffey's reign is the shortest, as he lost the title the same day. Drew Galloway currently holds the record for the most defenses, both within an individual reign and cumulatively. Joe Coffey holds the record for least successful defenses, losing the championship to Wolfgang in his first defense.

Title history

Combined reigns

References

External links
ICW World Heavyweight Championship

Insane Championship Wrestling championships
World heavyweight wrestling championships
2006 in professional wrestling